Helge Allan Arthur Vasenius (23 February 1927 – 27 January 2008) was a Finnish diver. He competed at the 1952 Summer Olympics and the 1956 Summer Olympics.

References

External links
 

1927 births
2008 deaths
Finnish male divers
Olympic divers of Finland
Divers at the 1952 Summer Olympics
Divers at the 1956 Summer Olympics
Divers from Helsinki